meso-Octamethylporphyrinogen, usually referred to simply as octamethylporphyrinogen, is an organic compound with the formula (Me2C-C4H2NH)4 (Me = CH3.  It is one of the simplest porphyrinogens, a family of compounds that occur as intermediates in the biosynthesis of hemes and chlorophylls.  In contrast to those rings, porphyrinogens are colorless since they lack extended conjugation.  The prefix meso-octamethyl indicates that the eight methyl groups are located on the carbon centers that interconnect the four pyrrole rings.  Also unlike porphyrins, the porphyrinogens are highly ruffled.

Preparation
The compound was first reported by Adolph Bayer. It is made by condensation of pyrrole with acetone.

Reactions
The pyrrolic N-H centers of ctamethylporphyrinogen can be deprotonated, and the resulting tetraanion functions as a tetradentate ligand for a variety of metal ions.

References

Tetrapyrroles